is a Japanese politician of the Democratic Party of Japan, a member of the House of Representatives in the Diet (national legislature). A native of Iinan, Mie and graduate of Tsu City College, he worked at the government of the town of Iinan from 1968 to 1998. He was elected to the first of his two terms in the assembly of Mie Prefecture in 1999 and to the House of Representatives for the first time in 2005.

References

External links 
  in Japanese.

1949 births
Living people
People from Mie Prefecture
Members of the House of Representatives (Japan)
Democratic Party of Japan politicians
21st-century Japanese politicians